During the 1973–74 season Hibernian, a football club based in Edinburgh, came second out of 18 clubs in the Scottish First Division and reached the fifth round of the Scottish Cup.

Scottish First Division

Final League table

Drybrough Cup

Scottish League Cup

Group stage

Group 2 final table

Knockout stage

UEFA Cup

Scottish Cup

See also
List of Hibernian F.C. seasons

References

External links
Hibernian 1973/1974 results and fixtures, Soccerbase

Hibernian F.C. seasons
Hibernian